The great rufous woodcreeper (Xiphocolaptes major) is a species of bird in the Dendrocolaptinae subfamily, the woodcreepers.
It is found in Argentina, Bolivia, Brazil, and Paraguay.
Its natural habitats are subtropical or tropical dry forests and subtropical or tropical moist lowland forests. At 155 g (5.5 oz) and 35 cm (14 in), this is the largest woodcreeper and, if correctly allied with the family, is the largest furnariid.

References

External links

Great rufous woodcreeper videos on the Internet Bird Collection
Great rufous woodcreeper photo gallery VIREO
Photo-High Res

great rufous woodcreeper
Birds of the Gran Chaco
great rufous woodcreeper
Taxa named by Louis Jean Pierre Vieillot
Taxonomy articles created by Polbot